Shoot-'Em-Up Construction Kit (a.k.a. SEUCK) is a game creation system for the Commodore 64, Amiga and Atari ST created by Sensible Software and published by Outlaw (part of Palace Software) in 1987. It allows the user to make simple shoot 'em ups by drawing sprites and backgrounds and editing attack patterns. The advertising promoted the Kit with the phrase "By the programmers of Wizball and Parallax".

Design 

The Kit presents users with a series of menus for customising every aspect of the game. Level graphics are created with the Background Editor, using a series of blocks for plotting into the level maps' all moving elements are designed with the Sprite Editor. Sprites are assigned to "Objects" - for example, enemy bullets - with separate animation and colour settings. Editing the "enemy bits" changes the behaviour of an enemy (which projectiles it may shoot, how many points it is worth), while "player limitations" does the same for Player 1 (or player 2, if enabled). Whereas the Commodore 64 version contains a simple Sound FX Editor with slider controls, on the Amiga and ST versions this feature is replaced with IFF sounds.

Enemies are added to the game by placing them on the background and then moving them, with options to link enemies together. The front end (title screen) may also be edited.

Games can feature still screens (held for a set number of seconds), "push" scrolling (based on the player's movement) or constant vertical scrolling. Bonus point items are possible, as well as extra lives awarded at regular scoring intervals.

SEUCK is packaged with sample games, to demonstrate what may be done with the kit. The Commodore 64 version comes with Slap 'n' Tickle (inspired by Slap Fight), Outlaw (a Wild West shoot 'em up in the style of the arcade game Commando), Transputer Man (set inside a computer and partially inspired by the arcade game Robotron 2084), and Celebrity Squares (featuring graphics drawn by several C64 personalities including video game journalists Gary Liddon and Gary Penn). The Amiga and Atari versions (released in 1989)  feature Slap 'n' Tickle, Quazar, and an "army man" game, Blood 'N' Bullets, which features a sound effect of "Okay, suckers" sampled from the Red Dwarf episode "Queeg".

Since it is possible to export SEUCK games as stand-alone files, at the height of the software's popularity game companies and magazines received many games created with the Kit.

Reception 
SEUCK was well received, earning a Zzap! Gold Medal Award. SEUCK was reviewed in Commodore Disk User Issue 2.

Derivatives 

While attending college Ray Larabie, best known for his custom typefaces, created several games using SEUCK. Because of their distinctiveness and quality they quickly spread throughout the Amiga community via the BBS network, with many ending up on Amiga Magazine coverdisks. Titles included Monster Truck Rally, Wielder Of Atoms, Mulroney Blast and Smurf Hunt.

Other notable SEUCK-based titles include several works by Italian software company, System Editoriale s.r.l., such as Emiliano Sciarra's Ciuffy, and the early music game, Amadeus Revenge.

See also 

 Garry Kitchen's GameMaker - A versatile game development platform for the C64.
 Arcade Game Construction Kit - Another game development platform for the C64.
 Adventure Construction Set
 Pinball Construction Set

References

External links 
 The SEUCK Vault, a website with tips on using the Kit.
 S.E.U.C.K., a free remake of SEUCK for Windows, Linux and Mac, implemented using GLBasic.
 German C64-Wiki, in-depth German Wiki-site for the construction kit.
 Shoot 'Em Up Kit, a shoot 'em up creator inspired by the SEUCK.

1987 video games
Sensible Software
Commodore 64 games
Amiga games
Atari ST games
Video games developed in the United Kingdom
Video game engines
Video game development software
Video games with user-generated gameplay content